The Astaka is a twin-tower residential complex at Johor Bahru, Malaysia. It is also the tallest residential skyscraper in Southeast Asia. Tower A is the tallest building in Malaysia outside of Kuala Lumpur. 

The development is located at Zone A of Iskandar Malaysia. It houses 438 apartments, including penthouse duplexes. The penthouse duplexes in both towers are exclusively owned by the Sultan of Johor.

References

External links

Residential skyscrapers in Malaysia
Buildings and structures in Johor Bahru
2017 establishments in Malaysia
Residential buildings completed in 2017
Twin towers